Studio Zünd: 40 Ans d'Évolution is a box set by French rock band Magma. Released in 2009, the box consists of the band's 1970 to 2004 studio albums and the exclusive double CD Archiw I & II, a compilation of unreleased material, including the 1970 film soundtrack for 24 heures seulement, an alternate version of Mekanïk Destruktïw Kommandöh - originally issued as a bonus on the first CD edition of the MDK album, the band's first demo recordings from 1970 (taken from an acetate disc), and an alternate take of "Eliphas Levi" from Merci (1984). Album tracks are not remastered. A similar live box set, Köhnzert Zünd, was released 2012.

Track listing
 CD1&2 - Kobaïa (1970)
 CD3 - 1001° Centigrades (1971)
 CD4 - Mëkanïk Dëstruktïẁ Kömmandöh (1973)
 CD5 - Köhntarkösz (1974)
 CD6 - Ẁurdah Ïtah (1974)
 CD7 - Üdü Ẁüdü (1976)
 CD8 - Attahk (1978)
 CD9 - Merci (1984)
 CD10 - K.A. (Kohntarkosz Anteria) (2004)
 CD11&12 - Archiw I & II

Lineup
Information on the lineup of the individual CD's can be found on the linked album pages.

Weblinks
 Studio Zünd on Seventh Records
 Studio Zünd reviews on Prog Archives

References 

Magma (band) albums